Ali Derakhshan (born February 17, 1999) is an Iranian footballer who plays as a left back, currently playing for Iranian club Havadar in the Persian Gulf Pro League.

Club career

Esteghlal Ahvaz 
Derakhshan was part of Esteghlal Ahvaz from club date in 2017 to 2018.

Fajr Sepasi 
Ali Derakhshan joined Fajr Sepasi Football Club in 2020 and left the club in 2021 to join the Havadar team.

References

External links 
 
 Ali Derakhshan at eurosport
 Ali Derakhshan at flashscore
 

1999 births
Living people
Iranian footballers
Association football defenders
Havadar S.C. players
Fajr Sepasi players
Esteghlal Ahvaz players